Chyornaya Rechka ("Black stream") is a station of the Saint Petersburg Metro which opened on 4 November 1982.

The station named in honour of the place of the last duel of Russian poet Alexander Pushkin.

Gallery

External links 
 
Saint Petersburg Metro stations
Railway stations in Russia opened in 1982
1982 establishments in the Soviet Union
Railway stations located underground in Russia